Lienz-Nikolsdorf Airport is a private use airport located  east-southeast of Lienz, Tirol, Austria.

See also
List of airports in Austria

References

External links 
 Airport record for Lienz-Nikolsdorf Airport at Landings.com

 Flugplatz Lienz Airport Website with webcam

Airports in Austria
Buildings and structures in Tyrol (state)
Transport in Tyrol (state)